Conneaut Lake High School was part of the Conneaut School District located in Conneaut Lake, Pennsylvania.

External links

Schools in Crawford County, Pennsylvania
Public high schools in Pennsylvania